Monument Falls is a waterfall located in Glacier National Park, Montana, US. Monument Falls descends from meltwater off Sperry Glacier en route to Avalanche Lake. Numerous other waterfalls are located in the immediate area but they remain unnamed.

Gallery

References

Landforms of Glacier National Park (U.S.)
Waterfalls of Glacier National Park (U.S.)